Our Lady of the Immaculate Conception and of the Triumph of the Cross of Panguil Bay (Spanish: Nuestra Señora dela Inmaculada Concepción y del Triunfo de la Cruz de Migpangi), also known as the Virgin of Cotta and The Blessed Virgin of Cotta is a statue of the Blessed Virgin Mary venerated at the Metropolitan Cathedral of the Immaculate Conception in Ozamiz City, Misamis Occidental in the Philippines and is the patroness of Ozamiz City. The image was named after the fort Fuerte de la Concepcion y del Triunfo of Panguil Bay where it was originally kept.

Description
The wooden image shows the Virgin Mary standing on a cloud. The image shows Mary wearing brown and white robes, which is carved as if being blown by the wind, a crown, and a scapular. At her foot are 3 angels, a crescent moon, and a serpent under her feet biting a fruit. The image is 35 inches from head to toe, while her crown and the cloud beneath her feet adds an additional 12 inches. Making it a total of 3 feet and 11 inches. The image is approximately more than 250 years old.

History
 
The image was brought to Ozamiz sometime during the construction of the fort in 1756 or after it was finished. The fort was built by Father Jose Ducos, SJ, to serve as an outpost of Spanish suzerainty in Muslim Mindanao. Soon after, Father Ducos placed the fort and the town that grew around it under the patronage of the Blessed Virgin Mary, under the title of the Immaculate Conception. The image, in the blue and pink attire, was enshrined in a special chapel that was built inside the walls of the fort. Outside the fort on the South wall facing the bay was also a carved bas relief image of the Virgin. The relief image wears a pink and blue dress and she stands on a crescent moon with three angels hovering in a cloud. A crown and the Holy Spirit in the form of a dove can be seen above the Virgin. 

Sometime between 1875 and 1884, fray Jorge Carcabilla, a Spanish priest that was assigned in Misamis at the time, moved the statue to the town's parish church (now the Metropolitan Cathedral of the Immaculate Conception of Ozamiz) as the chapel and the image was not properly taken care of. The image was kept on the side of the altar of the church, and was encased in a crystal urn. Its feast is customarily observed on July 16, which was also the feast day of Our Lady of Mt. Carmel. Because of that, the image was erroneously taken for that of the Lady of Mt. Carmel by devout devotees who are unaware of the image's true origins and was repainted in the early 1930's. On December 8, 1954, the image participated in the Marian Congress in Manila. A few days before the event, the image was first brought to the sculpting firm of Maximo Vicente in order to be restored in preparation for the event.

In 1955, an earthquake occurred which caused the destruction of the church. Among the rubble was the Virgin, which was intact. Because of this, the devotees considered this as a miracle of the image. When the new cathedral was built, the miraculous image was placed on the right side of the altar.

Disappearance
In 1975, the image was sacrilegiously stolen from the cathedral. Despite multiple efforts from religious organizations, provincial and city officials, and concerned citizens, the image was nowhere to be found for more than four decades. Many residents stated that upon the disappearance of the Virgin, calamities began to disturb the peaceful city. While the original statue was missing during that time, the archdiocese commissioned a replica and placed it in front of the cathedral on July 1993. The replica and the old bas relief image at the fort became the focal points of the devotion to Nuestra Señora del Triunfo de la Cruz for the meantime.

The Image's Reappearance and Return
After 42 years, the image of the Virgin was discovered in the Nonesuch Antique Fair in Makati City sometime on late October 2017. The image was found in looming condition, with its paint peeling off, most notably on the face and hands, and crack marks can be seen. The image at the time was under the custody of an antique dealer named Jose Vicente Esposo in Metro Manila. He stated that he acquired the image from a deceased antique dealer and he was soon enthralled with her beauty. After finding out about the image's origins through thorough research, he restored the image and returned it to Ozamiz on December 8, 2017, the Feast of the Immaculate Conception. A procession was soon held that started at the Ozamiz Airport. The image was first taken to the fort where a mass was held. Soon after, the image was taken to the city's cathedral, where a Thanksgiving Mass and the formal turnover of the image to the Archdiocese of Ozamis took place. The image was later enthroned on a glass case in the on top of the altar for public veneration.

References

External links
Philippines Tour Guide

Titles of Mary
Statues of the Virgin Mary
Marian devotions
Patron saints
Ozamiz